Cathedral of San Salvador may refer to:

 Cathedral of San Salvador, Oviedo, Spain
 Cathedral of San Salvador (Zaragoza), Spain
 San Salvador Cathedral, San Salvador